Thomas Sydnor Asbury (born July 14, 1945) is a retired American men's college basketball coach. He spent two separate terms as head coach of Pepperdine University, retiring from that position in 2011. He also was a head coach for Kansas State University and served as an assistant coach at Pepperdine, the University of Wyoming (his alma mater), and the University of Alabama.

Career

Pepperdine
Asbury was an assistant coach at Pepperdine for nine seasons before succeeding Jim Harrick as head coach. Asbury was very successful in his first stint at Pepperdine, becoming the conference coach of the year twice and compiling a 125–59 record in his first six years. He took the Waves to the NCAA Tournament in 1991, 1992 and 1994, as well as two NIT appearances, three regular-season WCC titles and three WCC Tournament championships.

Kansas State and Alabama
His success landed him the head coaching job at Kansas State University.  He coached the Wildcats for six seasons making the NCAA tournament once and the NIT Tournament twice.  However, his final season ended in 1999–2000 at Kansas State with a 9–19 record and a 2–14 conference record.  He was fired and later returned to coaching as an assistant at the University of Alabama under former pupil Mark Gottfried.  Mark Fox, the head coach at the University of California, is another former Asbury assistant, having coached with him at Kansas State.

Return to Pepperdine and retirement
Asbury came out of retirement to coach Pepperdine for a second time prior to the 2008–09 season. After three more seasons, on March 11, 2011, Asbury announced his retirement, turning the Pepperdine program over to assistant Marty Wilson. In October 2012, Asbury was inducted into the Pepperdine Athletics Hall of Fame.

Head coaching record

References

1945 births
Living people
Alabama Crimson Tide men's basketball coaches
American men's basketball coaches
American men's basketball players
Basketball coaches from Colorado
Basketball players from Denver
College men's basketball head coaches in the United States
Forwards (basketball)
Kansas State Wildcats men's basketball coaches
Pepperdine Waves men's basketball coaches
Sportspeople from Denver
Wyoming Cowboys basketball coaches
Wyoming Cowboys basketball players